Muhammad Haziq bin Nadzli (born 6 January 1998) is a Malaysian professional footballer who plays as a goalkeeper for Malaysia Super League club Johor Darul Ta'zim.

Club career

Johor Darul Ta'zim
On 3 December 2016, Haziq signed a contract with Malaysia Super League club Johor Darul Ta'zim from PDRM.

Personal life
Nadzli tied the engagement knot with Malaysian actress, Eyra Hazali on 1 December 2018  and married in November 2019. They have a child named Hayder Qhalish Haziq who was born in August 2020 in Ampang Puteri Medical Center, Ampang, Selangor following Endra Haziq in July 2022 at KPJ Bandar Dato Onn Hospital

Career statistics

Club
As of 10 October 2022.

International

International career
Haziq Nadzli's first international appearance was for Malaysia U-21 in the 2016 Nations Cup.

Honours

Club
Johor Darul Ta'zim
 Malaysia Cup: 2017, 2022
 Malaysia Super League: 2017, 2018, 2022
 Piala Sumbangsih: 2022
 Malaysia FA Cup: 2022

Johor Darul Ta'zim II
 Malaysia Challenge Cup: 2019

International
Malaysia U-16
 AFF U-16 Youth Championship: 2013

Malaysia U-23
Southeast Asian Games
 Silver Medal: 2017

References

External links
 Haziq Nadzli Profile  at Harimau Malaysia

1998 births
Living people
Malaysian footballers
Malaysia Super League players
People from Selangor
PDRM FA players
Johor Darul Ta'zim F.C. players
Association football goalkeepers
Malaysian people of Malay descent
Southeast Asian Games silver medalists for Malaysia
Southeast Asian Games medalists in football
Footballers at the 2018 Asian Games
Competitors at the 2017 Southeast Asian Games
Asian Games competitors for Malaysia
Competitors at the 2019 Southeast Asian Games
Malaysia international footballers
Malaysia youth international footballers